No. 159 Squadron RAF was a Royal Air Force squadron that was active as a bomber, mine-laying, reconnaissance and transport unit in the Second World War.

History

Formation in World War I
The original 159 Squadron was to be formed during the First World War, but the idea was disbanded so that reinforcements could be sent to France.

Reformation in the Second World War
No. 159 Squadron was reformed at RAF Molesworth on 2 July 1942 during the Second World War and its ground crew personnel were posted, without aircraft, to the Middle East on 12 February 1942 and then to India on 18 May 1942. Flying Consolidated Liberators, the squadron was posted to Palestine in July 1942 and carried out bombing raids in North Africa, Italy and Greece. No. 159 then flew to India on 30 September 1942. The first operation against the Japanese was on 17 November 1942, and during the rest of the war, the squadron flew mine-laying, bombing, and reconnaissance missions over Burma, Siam, Malaya, Indo-China and the Dutch East Indies.

In October 1944, the Squadron mounted an audacious minelaying raid on the Japanese held port of Penang. The mission entailed a round trip of over 3,000 miles, which at the time was the longest distance bombing raid in history. Eric Burchmore was in charge of the modification and preparation of the Consolidated Liberator aircraft used for the mission. The raid was led by Wing Commander James Blackburn and was a complete success, with the port of Penang completely blocked by mines and all of the aircraft and crews returning safely. Burchmore was awarded a military MBE in recognition of his contribution to the operation, whilst Wing Commander Blackburn was awarded a Bar to his DSO and was also awarded the American DFC by the United States.

After the war, No.159 converted to transport and survey duties before disbanding on 1 June 1946.

Notable squadron members

Stanley James Woodbridge, GC
Flight Sergeant Stanley James Woodbridge, a wireless operator who served with 159 squadron, was awarded the George Cross posthumously in 1948. Woodbridge had steadfastly refused to divulge his codes and other details of his radio equipment to his Japanese captors. Woodbridge was tortured and eventually beheaded along with three other members of his crew

James Blackburn DSO & Bar, DFC & Bar, DFC (US)
Wing Commander James Blackburn DSO & Bar, DFC & Bar, DFC (US)[1] (1916–1993) was a Royal Air Force officer who completed a record five tours of operations during World War II.

See also
Eric Burchmore

Aircraft operated

Squadron bases

Commanding officers

References

Notes

Bibliography

 Halley, James J. The Squadrons of the Royal Air Force & Commonwealth, 1918-88. Tonbridge, Kent, UK: Air-Britain (Historians) Ltd., 1988. .
 Jefford, C.G. RAF Squadrons, a Comprehensive Record of the Movement and Equipment of all RAF Squadrons and their Antecedents since 1912. Shrewsbury, Shropshire, UK: Airlife Publishing, 2001. .
 Moyes, Philip J.R. Bomber Squadrons of the RAF and their Aircraft. London: Macdonald and Jane's (Publishers) Ltd., 1976. .

External links

 No. 159 squadron history
 Tom Fraser an ordinary airman in 159 Squadron in India
   Lucian Brett Ercolani, Obituary
 

159
1918 establishments in the United Kingdom
Military units and formations of Ceylon in World War II
Military units and formations in Mandatory Palestine in World War II
Military units and formations established in 1918
Military units and formations disestablished in 1918
Military units and formations established in 1942
Military units and formations disestablished in 1946